Keith Jones may refer to:

Sportsmen 
Keith Jones (American football) (born 1966), former American football running back
Keith Jones (cricketer, born 1942), former English cricketer
Keith Jones (cricketer, born 1951), former English cricketer
Keith Jones (ice hockey) (born 1968), Canadian former ice hockey player and current ice hockey sportscaster
Keith Jones (English footballer) (born 1965), English former footballer
Keith Jones (Welsh footballer) (1928–2007), Welsh former footballer
Keith Jones (rugby league) (active 1984–1990), English rugby player

Others 
Keith Jones (surgeon) (1911–2012), Australian medical practitioner and surgeon
Keith Jones (priest) (born 1945), retired British Anglican priest
Keith Jones (broadcaster), American news anchor and reporter in Philadelphia, Pennsylvania
Keith Brymer Jones, British potter and ceramic designer